Colbert is an unincorporated community in Spokane County, Washington, United States. The town is on U.S. Route 2, north of the city of Spokane. Colbert was originally called Dragoon; the present name is for Harry Colbert, an early postmaster. A post office was established as Dragoon in 1890, and the name was changed to Colbert in 1902. The Spokane Renaissance Faire is held annually in a field in Colbert.

Education
Children who live in Colbert attend either Colbert Elementary School on Greenbluff Road or Midway Elementary School, both of which, along with Shiloh Hills Elementary and Meadow Ridge Elementary, feed into the newly formed Mountainside Middle School (previously Mead Middle School), which feeds into Mount Spokane High School. These schools are part of the Mead School District. 

Colbert Elementary School has about 600 students enrolled, with 25 classroom teachers, 11 specialists, and 26 support staff. 

The K-12 private school Northwest Christian is located in Colbert.

References

External links
 Colbert Elementary School
 Midway Elementary School
 Northwest Christian Schools

Unincorporated communities in Spokane County, Washington
Unincorporated communities in Washington (state)